The Cragg Vale Coiners, sometimes the Yorkshire Coiners, were a band of counterfeiters in England, based in Cragg Vale, near Hebden Bridge, West Riding of Yorkshire. They produced fake gold coins in the late 18th century to supplement small incomes from weaving.

Activities
Led by "King" David Hartley, the Coiners obtained real coins from publicans, sometimes on the promise that they could "grow" the investment by smelting the original metals with base ores. They removed the coins' genuine edges and milled them again, collecting the shavings. The coins were only slightly smaller. They then melted down the shavings to produce counterfeits. Designs were punched into the blank "coins" with a hammer and a "coining kit". The Coiners then had their accomplices place the fakes into circulation. Most of the counterfeit coins had French, Spanish or Portuguese designs.

The Cragg Coiners were so successful because the region of Yorkshire they operated within was isolated from centralised England.

Downfall
In 1769, William Dighton (Deighton), a public official, investigated the possibilities of a counterfeiting gang in Cragg Vale. A Coiner by the name of James Broadbent betrayed the gang by turning King's evidence and revealed the gang's existence and operations to authorities. Dighton had Hartley arrested.

The arrest made the Coiners vengeful. Isaac Hartley, "King" David's brother, engineered a plan to have Dighton killed, with a number of Coiners subscribing  a total of one hundred Guineas in support of the plan. On 10 November 1769, two farm hands employed by the Coiners, Matthew Normanton and Robert Thomas, ambushed Dighton in Halifax and shot him in Bull Close Lane.

Charles Watson-Wentworth (the Marquess of Rockingham and former Prime Minister) was tasked with hunting down the killers. He had thirty Coiners arrested by Christmas Day. David Hartley was hanged at 'York Tyburn' near York on 28 April 1770, and buried in the village of Heptonstall, West Riding of Yorkshire. His brother, Isaac, escaped the authorities and lived until 1815. As for Dighton's murderers, Normanton was hanged on 15 April 1775 and Thomas was hanged on 6 August 1774.

Known members
 David Hartley, who lived at a farm called Bell House, was the leader of the gang.
 Isaac Hartley, David Hartley's brother, lived at Elphaborough Hall, Mytholmroyd. Recruited Matthew Normanton and Robert Thomas to kill William Dighton
 Thomas Sunderland, Joseph Shaw and a Mr. Lightoulers were engravers for the Coiners.
 James Broadbent, the informant.
 Jonathon Bolton, Luke Dewhurst and Abraham Lumb were subscribers to Isaac Hartley’s plan to kill Dighton along with David Hartley and Isaac himself 
 
 Other Coiners included John Wilcock, Thomas Clayton, Matthew Normanton, Thomas Spencer and James Oldfield.

In popular culture
The Cragg Coiners were the subject of a children's novel Gold Pieces by Phyllis Bentley. The story is seen through the eyes of a fictitious twelve-year-old boy who lives nearby and who befriends the son of David Hartley. All the places and the main characters such as David Hartley and William Dighton are given their real names. Gold Pieces was reprinted in 2007.

The story of the gang was used as a basis in the independently published graphic novel, The Last Coiner, written by Peter M. Kershaw. David Hartley is renamed "David Hawksworth" and is portrayed, through manipulated photography, by the actor Keith Patrick.

The Chumbawamba song, Snip Snip Snip, from the album Shhh, is inspired by the story of the Cragg Coiners.

The story of the coiners is told in a song called King of the Coiners written by UK singer/songwriter/guitarist Steve Tilston published in his 2008 album Ziggurat.

During a 2016 episode of the BBC's Last Tango in Halifax, the story was part of an evening dinner conversation at Caroline McKenzie-Dawson's (played by Sarah Lancashire) new house. One of the characters (Harry played by Paul Copley) retold the story of the Cragg Vale Coiners and mentioned that Matthew Turnton was known to haunt the house.

The story of David Hartley and the coiners is the subject of a researched novel entitled The Gallows Pole by author Ben Myers, published in 2017. It received a Roger Deakin award for writing concerned with "natural history, landscape and environment" and won the Walter Scott Prize 2018, the world's biggest prize for historical fiction. Judges described the book as "a roaring furnace of a novel. In telling a big story about a small place, Benjamin Myers portrays social upheavals which have a sharp contemporary echo, as well as bringing to light a little-known and fascinating fragment of rural English history, through his portrayal of the lawless ‘coiners’ and their charismatic warlord pitting themselves against the massed forces of industrial and social change. He meets the challenge for every author of historical fiction – bringing alive the past and speaking forcefully to the readers of today.’  The novel has been translated into several languages. In 2021 the BBC announced that director Shane Meadows is adapting the story as a television drama, with Element Pictures and A24 co-production for the BBC.

References

External links
"Crag Coiners", The Mytholmroyd Net.
"Yorkshire Coiners", Yorkshire Coiners website
"Cragg Vale Coiners walk", illustrated map of the Cragg Vale Coiners walk.
English counterfeiters